
The year 504 BC was a year of the pre-Julian Roman calendar. In the Roman Empire it was known as the Year of the Consulship of Poplicola and Tricipitinus (or, less frequently, year 250  Ab urbe condita). The denomination 504 BC for this year has been used since the early medieval period, when the Anno Domini calendar era became the prevalent method in Europe for naming years.

Events 
 By place 

 Roman Republic 
 A war between Rome and the Sabines ends, having begun in 505 BC.

References

 
500s BC